Clifford Aboagye (born 11 February 1995) is a Ghanaian professional footballer who plays as an attacking midfielder for Liga MX club Querétaro.

Club career
Born in Accra, Aboagye made his senior debuts for International Allies, being promoted to Ghana Premier League in his first and only season. In July 2013 the club accepted a $800,000 bid from Udinese, and he signed a five-year contract with the Serie A club; he was subsequently loaned to Granada CF, linking up with the Andalusians also until 2018 and being assigned to the reserves in Segunda División B.

On 8 January 2015 Aboagye made his professional debut, coming on as a second half substitute for Riki in a 1–2 home loss against Sevilla FC, for the campaign's Copa del Rey. He left the club on 22 December of the following year, after only representing the B-side.

On 2 January 2017, Aboagye signed a six-month loan deal with Liga MX side Club Atlas.

International career
Aboagye appeared with Ghana under-20s in 2013 FIFA U-20 World Cup, being named the Bronze Ball of the tournament as his side finished third.

Honours 
Ghana U20

 FIFA U-20 World Cup third place: 2013
 African U-20 Championship runner-up: 2013

Individual

 FIFA U-20 World Cup Bronze Ball: 2013
African U-20 Championship Team of the Tournament: 2015

References

External links
 
 
 
 

1995 births
Living people
Footballers from Accra
Ghanaian footballers
Association football midfielders
International Allies F.C. players
Udinese Calcio players
Segunda División B players
Club Recreativo Granada players
Granada CF footballers
Atlas F.C. footballers
Querétaro F.C. footballers
Liga MX players
Ghanaian expatriate footballers
Ghanaian expatriate sportspeople in Spain
Expatriate footballers in Spain
Expatriate footballers in Mexico
Ghana under-20 international footballers